The poleaxe (also pollaxe, pole-axe, pole axe, poleax, polax) is a European polearm that was widely used by medieval infantry.

Etymology 
Most etymological authorities consider the poll- prefix historically unrelated to "pole", instead meaning "head". However, some etymologists, including Eric Partridge, believe that the word is derived from "pole".

Types of poleaxe 

The poleaxe design arose from the need to breach the plate armour of men at arms during the 14th and 15th centuries.

The design of the head varied greatly with a variety of interchangeable parts and rivets. Generally, the head bore an axe blade or hammer head upon the damaging 'face', with a spike, hammer, or fluke on the reverse. In addition, there was a spike projecting from the end of the haft, often square in cross section. The head was attached to the squared-off wooden pole by long flat strips of metal, called langets, which were riveted in place on either two or four of its sides to reinforce the pole.  A round hilt-like disc called a rondelle was placed just below the head. They also appear to have borne one or two rings along the pole's length as places to prevent hands from slipping. Also of note is that the butt end of the staff, opposite the weapon's head, bore a spike.

On quick glance, the poleaxe is often confused with the similar-looking halberd. However, the axe blade on a poleaxe seems to have been consistently smaller than that of a halberd. A smaller head concentrates the kinetic energy of the blow on a smaller area, enabling the impact to defeat armour, while broader halberd heads are better against opponents with less armour. Furthermore, many halberds had their heads forged as a single piece, while the poleaxe was typically modular in design.

Fighting with poleaxe 
The poleaxe was usually used by knights and other men-at-arms while fighting on foot. The poleaxe has a sophisticated fighting technique, which is based on quarterstaff fighting. The blade of the poleaxe can be used, not only for simply hacking down the opponent, but also for tripping him, disarming him and blocking his blows. Both the head spike and butt spike can be used for thrusting attacks. The shaft itself is also a central part of the weapon, able to block the enemy's blows (the langets helping to reinforce the shaft) as well as for "cross-checking" and tripping.

Many treatises on poleaxe fighting survive from the 15th and 16th centuries. Poleaxe fighting techniques have been rediscovered with the increasing interest in historical European martial arts.

Today the poleaxe is a weapon of choice of many medieval re-enactors. Rubber poleaxe heads designed for safe combat are available commercially.

See also 
 Bec de corbin
 Bill (weapon)
 War hammer

References

Further reading 
 Schulze, André (ed.): Mittelalterliche Kampfesweisen. Band 2: Kriegshammer, Schild und Kolben. Mainz am Rhein: Zabern, 2007.

External links 

 Le Jeu de la Hache
 Spotlight: The Medieval Poleaxe (myArmoury.com article)

Medieval polearms